Chin-Shing Huang (born 1950) is a Taiwanese historian.

Huang completed a doctorate from Harvard University in 1983, and began working as a research fellow at Academia Sinica soon after graduation. He has held adjunct and honorary professorships and chairs at several universities in Taiwan, among them National Taiwan University, National Tsing Hua University, Taipei Medical University, and National Sun Yat-sen University. Huang was elected to membership within Academia Sinica in 2008.

References

1950 births
Living people
20th-century Taiwanese historians
21st-century Taiwanese historians
Harvard University alumni
Members of Academia Sinica